W06BD was a low-power television station based in Princeton Community High School in Princeton, Indiana, broadcasting locally on Insight Cable channel 7 and over-the-air on Channel 6. The station was owned by North Gibson School Corporation in partnership with Vincennes University. It is run as an educational program for sophomores, juniors, and seniors in Television Broadcasting classes at Princeton Community High School under the direction of Cynthia Schrodt.

Programming consisted of slide shows, local and school announcements, local sports, and specials produced by the students and community-minded individuals.

External links

Educational and instructional television channels
Gibson County, Indiana
Television stations in Indiana
Television channels and stations established in 1987
Vincennes University
1987 establishments in Indiana
Television channels and stations disestablished in 2016
2016 disestablishments in Indiana
Defunct television stations in the United States